Laura Grigori is a French-Romanian applied mathematician and computer scientist  known for her research on numerical linear algebra and communication-avoiding algorithms.

Education and career
Grigori earned her Ph.D. from Henri Poincaré University in 2001.

After postdoctoral research at the University of California, Berkeley and the Lawrence Berkeley National Laboratory, she became a researcher for INRIA in 2004, and became the head of the Alpines project in 2013. In 2021, she will join the SIAM Council as a Member-at-Large.

Recognition
A 2012 paper on communication-avoiding algorithms for parallel matrix decomposition by Grigori with James Demmel, Mark Hoemmen, and Julien Langou won the 2016 Society for Industrial and Applied Mathematics (SIAM) Activity Group on Supercomputing Best Paper Prize for the best paper on parallel scientific and engineering computing from the previous four years.

Grigori has been an invited plenary speaker at many international conferences on scientific computing. In 2020 Grigori was named a SIAM Fellow "for contributions to numerical linear algebra, including communication-avoiding algorithms".

References

External links

Year of birth missing (living people)
Living people
French mathematicians
French women mathematicians
Fellows of the Society for Industrial and Applied Mathematics